Jean Tourane (1919–1986) was a French filmmaker known for his footage of small animals. His birth name was Jean Briel. Among others he filmed a television series about a small duck named "Saturnin" during the 1960s. In the 1990s, clips from this series were merged into a new series called The Adventures of Dynamo Duck, which aired on Fox Kids in the United States.

Tourane started his professional career as a painter and photographer of small animals, and moved from photography into film. After making a number of shorts, he made the first full-length Saturnin movie, and was in 1964 awarded a contract for 78 television episodes with French television.

He was also for a time the mayor of the commune of Le Val-Saint-Germain in Essonne department, France.

Filmography as director
Saturnin Et La Fee Pas Comme Les Autres (1955) 
The Secret of Magic Island (Une Fee Pas Comme Les Autres) aka Secret of Outer Space Island (1956)
Saturnin, le petit canard (1964)

References
This article is based in part on material from the French Wikipedia.

External links
 
 "Photographs by Tourane Jean"

French film producers
1919 births
1986 deaths